Coleophora niphocrossa is a moth of the family Coleophoridae. It is found in South Africa.

References

Endemic moths of South Africa
niphocrossa
Moths described in 1920
Moths of Africa